Thakshak is a 1999 Indian action drama film written and directed by Govind Nihalani. Touted as Nihalani's attempt at popular cinema, this film stars Ajay Devgn, Tabu and Rahul Bose. The soundtrack was composed by A. R. Rahman.

Plot 
A poetic romance between Ishaan  and Suman set against the concrete Mumbai cityscape opens the film.

Ishaan, the only son of an affluent business family, and his contemporary peer Sunny, the grandson of the head of the business house, are being groomed to take over the business. They share a strong male bonding, Ishaan's controlled and silent strength acts as an anchor to Sunny's flamboyance and recklessly violent streak. The business, a construction empire built by Ishaan's father Nahar Singh and Sunny's grandfather, is rooted in violent and unlawful activities.

Ishaan, sheltered in comfort and security, begins to question his environment as his relationship with Suman, an idealistic young woman, opens a new world to him. As his love for her grows, so does his fear of losing her. Ishaan is caught between a life steeped in violence and his love for Suman who abhors violence.

Torn by his desire to leave the world of crime, and his sense of loyalty to his father and his friend, Ishaan unwillingly gets drawn deeper into violence, and finds himself a participant in an act of gruesome cold-blooded massacre. The image of a young girl disabled by this violent act haunts his conscience. His quiet, but firm resolve, to withdraw from the business clashes with Nahar Singh's pragmatism (to build power at any cost and to legalise crime with that power), and with Sunny's refusal to release him from his oath of loyalty.

The events escalate with Ishaan's arrest, and Nahar Singh's murder. Ishaan is finally forced to make a choice between personal loyalty and a larger allegiance to society and truth.

Cast 
 Ajay Devgan as Ishaan Kumar Singh
 Tabu as Suman Dev
 Amrish Puri as Nahar Singh
 Govind Namdeo as Aslam Khan
 Nethra Raghuraman as Nishi
 Rahul Bose as Sunny Bihani
 A. K. Hangal as Homeless Teacher
 Uttara Baokar as Ishaan's Mother
 Rajesh Tailang
 Vineet Kumar
 Anupam Shyam
 Eijaz Khan
 Ravi Patwardhan as Jodha Bhai

Soundtrack 

The music was composed by A. R. Rahman and lyrics penned by Mehboob and Sukhwinder Singh. The film marked Rahman's first collaboration with Govind Nihalani. Their first collaboration was supposed to be Nihalani's acclaimed 1994 film Drohkaal. Rahman signed Drohkaal, but opted out midway after losing his compositions for the film on a computer crash. Rahman's soundtrack for Thakshak received positive reviews and was reviewed as one of the highlights of the movie. The composition of the song "Jumbalika" was reused from A. R. Rahman's earlier work for a Tamil film En Swasa Kaatre, which was used in episode I Just Wasn't Made for These Times of science fiction TV series Defiance For the soundtrack to the 2001 Tamil film Star, Rahman reused most of his compositions from Thakshak. The song Rang De from the album was featured in an American film The Accidental Husband.

Reception 
Sharmila Taliculam of Rediff.com said "This is Nihalani's first attempt at making a popular film. And he goes overboard." Anupama Chopra writing for India Today stated "The performances are first-rate, especially those of Devgan and Amrish Puri. Only Bose, at times, goes over the top. Nihalani meanders unsteadily through the first half, but finds his grip during the second, expertly building up the tension to his minimalist climax. Thakshak is an experiment in popular format. It doesn't work fully, but patient viewers can expect to be amply rewarded."

References

External links 
 
 

1999 films
Films scored by A. R. Rahman
1990s Hindi-language films
1990s action drama films
Films directed by Govind Nihalani
Films set in Mumbai
Films about organised crime in India
1999 drama films